Polina Fedorova (pron. FYOH-duh-ruh-vuh, Polina Fyodorova, born 4 February 1996 in Cheboksary, Russia) is a Russian artistic gymnast.

Senior career

2012 and 2013
At the end of 2012, Polina Fedorova was officially approved as a member of the Russian main artistic gymnastics team for the next Olympic cycle.

At the 2013 Russian National Championships, she won the bronze medal in the all-around team competition (with the team of the Volga Federal District) and silver on the beam.

In November 2013, Fedorova won the all-around gold in the international KSI Cup in Budapest.

2014
At the 2014 Russian Championships, she won the gold medal on the floor.

Fedorova was selected as the alternate for the Russian squad at the 2014 World Artistic Gymnastics Championships. Along with her teammates, she won the bronze medal in team competition, even though she participated in neither the qualification, nor the team final.

2015 
Fedorova competed at the Russian Championships in March 2015. She won a bronze with her team. She placed 11th in the all around competition and 6th on the balance beam.

2019

Fedorova was initially named to Russia's team for the 2019 Summer Universiade; however, she was replaced by Uliana Perebinosova before the competition began.

Competitive history

References

External links 
 Profile at the International Federation of Gymnastics official website

1996 births
Living people
Russian female artistic gymnasts
Medalists at the World Artistic Gymnastics Championships
Universiade medalists in gymnastics
Universiade gold medalists for Russia
Universiade silver medalists for Russia
Medalists at the 2015 Summer Universiade